Ben Johnson (born February 10, 1977 in Southboro, Massachusetts) is an American soccer player, currently without a club.

Career

Youth and College
Johnson played four years of college soccer at Liberty University, where he earned 1st Team All-Big South honors as a senior.

Professional
Johnson signed with Charlotte Eagles straight out of college in 1998, and has been with the club ever since. He was part of the Eagles' championship-winning teams  in 2000 and 2005.

Off the field, Johnson also works as the Eagles' Director of Community Outreach, overseeing the strategies of the Eagles' community projects and handling all player, coach, mascot appearance requests. On March 10, 2010, Johnson announced his retirement from completive soccer.

Coaching
Johnson is also the head coach at Charlotte Christian High School, whom he led to a state semifinals appearance in 2008.

References

External links
 Charlotte Eagles bio

1977 births
Living people
American soccer players
Charlotte Eagles players
Liberty Flames men's soccer players
USL Second Division players
People from Southborough, Massachusetts
Sportspeople from Worcester County, Massachusetts
Soccer players from Massachusetts
Liberty University alumni
Association football midfielders
Association football defenders